Rough Island may refer to:

 Rough Island (Maryland) an island in Maryland, US
 Rough Island, Scotland
 Rough Island, County Down, a townland in County Down, Northern Ireland
 Rough Island, County Fermanagh, a townland in County Fermanagh, Northern Ireland